Théâtre du Silence (Theatre of silence) was a dance company created by Jacques Garnier and Brigitte Lefèvre.

History 
Founded by two Paris Opera Ballet dancers, Théâtre du Silence was one of the most famous dance companies in France. Its debut took place in 1972 at Théâtre de la Ville in Paris. From 1974 to 1985 the company was located in La Rochelle.

Théâtre du Silence created many contemporary dance ballets, mostly choreographed by Jacques Garnier or Brigitte Lefévre.
Choreographers such as Maurice Béjart, Merce Cunningham, David Gordon, Robert Kovitch ou Lar Lubovitch worked for the Théâtre du Silence and played an important role in spreading contemporary dance in France.

Repertory

Jacques Garnier 

 Suite de danses, on a Béla Bartók music, costums by Bruno Crespel ;
 Pas de deux, Anton Webern music, costumes  by Reynaldo Cerqueira, danced by Brigitte Lefèvre and Jacques Garnier ;
 La Nuit, musics by Jean-Pierre Drouet, Diego Masson and Michel Portal, danced by Nicole Chouret, Katia Grey, Brigitte Lefevre, Catherine Morel, Annette Mulard, Françoise Vaussenat, Martine Vuillermoz, Richard Duquesnoy, Jean Guizerix, Patrick Marty, Jacques Namont, Didier Schirpaz, Georges Teplitsky, Jean-Marc Torres;
 Leda, on a Paul Éluard text  danced by Brigitte Lefèvre, Daniel Gélin (narrator);
 Flashback, creation in Avignon, in August 1974, Igor Stravinsky's music, danced by Martine Clary, Mireille Conotte, Élisabeth Nicolas, Michel Bouche, Jacques Garnier, Olivier Marmin, Dragan Mocic, Catherine Morelle, Serge Bonnafoux ;
 Construction, creation in Lausanne, musics by Émile de Ceuninck, danced by Martine Clary, Mireille Conotte, Catherine Morelle, Élisabeth Nicolas, Michel Bouche, Serge Bonnafoux, Olivier Marmin, Dragan Mocic ;
 L'Ange, Jean-Pierre Drouet's music, claim by Saint Maur, with Gérard Frémy (musician), Jean-Pierre Drouet (musician), Michaël Denard (angel), Brigitte Lefèvre (She), Jean Guizerix (man) ;
 Aunis, danced in 1980 by Jacques Garnier, André Lafonta and Lari Léong.

Brigitte Lefèvre 

 Mikrokosmos, Béla Bartók music, danced  by Brigitte Lefèvre, Michaël Denard, Jacques Garnier ;
 Un certain temps, Terry Riley's music, danced  by Martine Clary, Mireille Conotte, Catherine Morelle, Élisabeth Nicolas, Michel Bouche, Jacques Garnier, Olivier Marmin, Dragan Mocic ;
 Oiseau triste, Maurice Ravel's music, choreographed by Jean Guizerix ;
 ''Oiseau de feu, by Michaël Denard (1980) ;
 SummerSpace, Merce Cunningham.

Dancers 

 Martine Clary
 André Lafonta
 Alexander Veal
 Lari Léong
 Jean Guizerix
 Michaël Denard
 Serge Bonnafoux
 Olivier Marmin
 Dragan Mocic
 Catherine Morelle
 Mireille Conotte
 Nicole Chouret
 Annette Mulard
 Françoise Vaussenat
 Martine Vuillermoz
 Richard Duquesnoy
 Patrick Marty
 Jacques Namont
 Didier Schirpaz
 Georges Teplitsky
 Jean-Marc Torres
 Katia Grey
 Nicole Chouret
 Josyane Consoli
 Cooky Chiapalone
 Élisabeth Nicolas
 Michel Bouche
 Stéphanie White
 Philippe Tresserra

 Nicole-Claire Perreau

References

External links 
 Numéridanse
 Classical TV
 INA
 Fresques INA

Ballet companies
Contemporary dance
Modern dance